Disney's Kurze Pause (Disney's Short Break) is a German sitcom series broadcast on Disney Channel Germany since 2006, with no firm scheduling except for its Sunday broadcast. It consists of vignettes approximately five to eight minutes long.

It is a German adaptation of Disney Channel Italy's Quelli dell'intervallo, which has also been adapted for other international markets with the title As the Bell Rings

Characters 

 Moritz (Mo) - played by Bela Klentze 
 Philip (Flip) - played by Benjamin Trinks
 Julia - played by Isabella Soric
 Katarina (Kata) - played by Sophie Belcredi
 Eberhard (Streberhard) - played by Lukas Nathrath
 Nico - played by Constantin 
 Anton (Tonne) - played by Roland Schreglmann
 DJ - played by Lea Kalbhenn
 Rocky - played by Laelia Platzer
 Spy - played by Tobias Core 
 Lilli - played by Julia Eggert
 Luca - played by Sabin Tambrea (Season 2-)
 Stella - played by Amy Mußul (Season 3-)

2006 German television series debuts
2008 German television series endings
German children's television series
German-language Disney Channel original programming
Disney Channels Worldwide original programming
2000s high school television series
2000s teen sitcoms
Television series about teenagers